Ivan Mikhailovich Belov (1906–1944) was a Soviet officer and naval captain. He was a victim of the Helsinki Lauttasaari incident on November 3, 1944. He is the main subject of a Finnish play, Matkalla Porkkalaan.

See also
List of unsolved murders

References

1906 births
1944 deaths
Soviet military personnel killed in World War II
Soviet Navy officers
Unsolved murders in Finland
Lauttasaari